This is a list of members of the 9th Parliament of Zimbabwe, which began in September 2018 and is set to expire in 2023. The Parliament of Zimbabwe is composed of the Senate and the National Assembly. The current Parliament's membership was set by the 2018 Zimbabwean general election, which gave ZANU–PF a ⅔ majority, with the MDC Alliance taking most of the remaining seats.

Key

Senate

Province seats

Chiefs 
Eighteen chiefs were elected to serve as senators in the 9th Parliament: the president and deputy president of the Chiefs' Council of Zimbabwe as senators ex officio, and 16 chiefs selected by the provincial chiefs' assemblies (two per province, except the metropolitan provinces Bulawayo and Harare).

Persons with disabilities 
Two seats in the Senate are reserved for persons with disabilities, one male and one female.

National Assembly

Constituency seats

Women's seats

Notes and references

Notes

References 

members of the 9th Parliament of Zimbabwe
 
 
Zimbabwe